Zighrin  is a Syrian village located in the Salamiyah Subdistrict of the Salamiyah District in Hama Governorate. According to the Syria Central Bureau of Statistics (CBS), Zighrin had a population of 2,327 in the 2004 census.

References 

Populated places in Salamiyah District